Gabriel de Paulo Limeira, or simply Gabriel, (born 20 August 1983 in Mauá) is a Brazilian footballer who currently plays for Clube de Regatas Brasil. Gabriel normally plays as a central defender, but is also apt to play left defender or as a defensive midfielder.

Club career
Gabriel previously played for Malmö FF in Allsvenskan and Associação Desportiva São Caetano and Fortaleza Esporte Clube in the Campeonato Brasileiro.

He played for Turkish club Manisaspor for which he signed in 2009. Towards the end of semester, he went back to his country Brazil.

For 2011 new season, he signed the contract with the club Botafogo and joined Sport Recife on a free transfer on 17 May 2011.

In 2012 January, Gabriel moved from Sport to Atlético Goianiense.

References

External links 
Malmö FF Profile
 

1983 births
Living people
People from Mauá
Brazilian footballers
Brazilian expatriate footballers
Associação Desportiva São Caetano players
Fortaleza Esporte Clube players
Esporte Clube Bahia players
Esporte Clube Santo André players
Botafogo Futebol Clube (SP) players
Sport Club do Recife players
Atlético Clube Goianiense players
Clube de Regatas Brasil players
Malmö FF players
Manisaspor footballers
Campeonato Brasileiro Série A players
Allsvenskan players
Süper Lig players
Expatriate footballers in Sweden
Expatriate footballers in Turkey
Association football defenders
Footballers from São Paulo (state)